Kiara Saulters (born May 24, 1995), known professionally as Kiiara, is an American singer and songwriter from Wilmington, Illinois. She is currently signed to Atlantic Records. Her 2015 single "Gold" peaked at number 13 on the Billboard Hot 100 chart. She is also known for contributing vocals to Linkin Park's 2017 single "Heavy".

Early life
Kiiara grew up in Wilmington, Illinois. She attended Wilmington High School where she played for the school's volleyball team. While recording her breakout EP, she also worked as a hardware store clerk. She started a studio internship to help familiarize herself with the music process and get practice recording.

Career
In 2013, Kiiara independently released an acoustic pop single called "Bring Me Back" under her real name.

In June 2015, after signing a deal to Atlantic Records and changing to her stage name from Kiara Saulters to Kiiara, she released her debut single "Gold". Later that year, "Gold" was chosen as background music of a 15-second Apple Watch commercial titled "Style". The song was her first entry on the Billboard Hot 100, peaking at number 13. Her debut extended play (EP), Low Kii Savage was released on March 22, 2016. The video for "Gold" quickly gained popularity, reaching five million views during mid-May 2016.

On September 15, 2016, Kiiara made her television debut, performing "Gold" on The Tonight Show with Jimmy Fallon. Kiiara was featured on Linkin Park's single, "Heavy", which was released digitally on February 16, 2017 and on radio on February 21. She later performed "Heavy" with Julia Michaels at the Linkin Park and Friends: Celebrate Life in Honor of Chester Bennington concert at the Hollywood Bowl which was held after the death of Linkin Park's vocalist Chester Bennington.

In March 2018, she was featured in Cheat Codes' single "Put Me Back Together".

On June 7, 2019, she released the single "Open My Mouth". Kiiara stated that it would serve as the lead single from her debut studio album, along with another single "Bipolar", released on September 6, 2019. However, both were cut from the final track listing, although the first one featured on a deluxe edition of the record.

On October 9, 2020, she released her debut studio album Lil Kiiwi, which includes her previously released singles "Gold", "Feels", and "Whippin" featuring Felix Snow, as well as new singles "I Still Do", "Never Let You", and "Numb" featuring DeathByRomy and Pvris. A deluxe edition of her album was later released, which included two songs "Intention" and "Tennessee"  taken from her debut extended play, Low Kii Savage, as well as two previous non-album singles, "Messy" and "Open My Mouth".

Influences
Kiiara has cited Eminem, Rihanna, Joyner Lucas, Yelawolf, and Linkin Park as her influences.

Discography

Studio albums

Extended plays

Singles

As lead artist

As featured artist

Guest appearances

Notes

References

1995 births
Living people
American women pop singers
American women songwriters
American people of English descent
Atlantic Records artists
Musicians from Oak Park, Illinois
People from Wilmington, Will County, Illinois
Singers from Illinois
Songwriters from Illinois
21st-century American women singers
21st-century American singers